Edenbridge Mill is a Grade II listed house converted tower mill in Edenbridge, Kent, England. It is on the west side of Mill Hill, just north of the hospital.

History

Edenbridge Mill was built in 1815. A mill was marked on the 1858–72 and 1903-10 Ordnance Survey maps. There is a stone inscribed 1812 A Friend. there is a red brick just above the large window on the first floor with 1812 also inscribed

William Ashby, the Westerham millwright worked on the mill in October 1825, fitting a new neck bearing of the windshaft, and did some repairs to the sails in January 1826. The cap was removed in 1937 and replaced by a flat roof.

Description

Edenbridge Mill is a five-storey brick tower mill with a domed cap. It had four sails carried on a cast iron windshaft. The mill was winded by a fantail. The mill  retains the Wallower, upright shaft and iron Great Spur Wheel, which drove the millstones overdrift.  Old photographs show that there was a stage at first floor level.

The property was sold in 1990 to a developer who over a nine-year period converted the building to residential use, making only minor changes to the outside. Two small windows, both on the third floor, were made larger. The air raid shelter was removed. The external staircase shown in earlier photographs was replaced with a staircase of a gradient compliant with building regulations.

Millers

Edward Bridger 1825 - 1839
H Sisley 1844
James Mellish 1845 - 1849
Stanford - 1854
Moses Brooks 1864 - 1874
James Mellish & Son - 1886

References for above:-

References

External links
Windmill World page on the mill.

Windmills in Kent
Grinding mills in the United Kingdom
Tower mills in the United Kingdom
Grade II listed buildings in Kent
Windmills completed in 1815
Edenbridge, Kent